"Blind Man" is a song by American hard rock band Aerosmith. The song was written by Steven Tyler, Joe Perry, and Taylor Rhodes. It was first released as a single in the United Kingdom on October 24, 1994, as a double A-side with "Crazy", then was issued in the United States by itself the following month.

"Blind Man" served as the first single from Aerosmith's Geffen-era compilation album, Big Ones, one of three songs from the record not previously released on any Aerosmith studio album. Despite the song's moderate success, reaching the top 10 in Canada, Finland, and Norway, the band rarely performed it live after the 1993–1994 Get a Grip Tour.

Recording
The song was recorded in two separate sessions. The first session took place at Power Station, New York City in April 1994, and was engineered by Adam Kasper with second engineering by Chris Albert. The second session took place at Capri Digital Studios, Capri, Italy in June, and was also engineered by Adam Kasper, but the second engineer on that session was Max Carola.

Music video
The music video for the song was also one of the only songs from Aerosmith's Geffen era not released on the video collection Big Ones You Can Look At. The live performance portions of the video were filmed during the day at The Summit in Houston, Texas before Aerosmith's performance there on September 30, 1994. The video was directed by Marty Callner, and featured cameo appearances by Pamela Anderson and A&R man John Kalodner. In 2009, drummer Joey Kramer admitted on That Metal Show that this is his least favorite Aerosmith video.

Track listing

Charts

Weekly charts

Year-end charts

Release history

References

Aerosmith songs
1994 singles
Music videos directed by Marty Callner
Songs written by Steven Tyler
Songs written by Joe Perry (musician)
Songs written by Taylor Rhodes
Geffen Records singles
1994 songs
Song recordings produced by Michael Beinhorn